Udayam is a Singaporean Tamil language reality makeover show produced by Lavin Selvan ( 2 seasons only ). Its first season aired on MediaCorp Vasantham from 7 September to 26 October 2017 on every Thursday at 9:00PM for 8 episodes, and its third season aired in 2020. Its initial concept is an adaptation from American reality television series Extreme Makeover: Home Edition. The show was hosted by television personality Udaya Soundari and clinched the awards for its production and host being the best info-ed series for its first 2 seasons..

Overview
In seasons 1 and 2, Udaya visits 8 homes of deserving families to plan and carry out a room makeover. In season 3, the show visited hawker stalls to give them a makeover with the help of celebrity chef S. R. Bala.

List of episodes

Season 1

Producer
Lavin Selvan

Soundtrack

Broadcast
Series was released on 7 September 2017 on Mediacorp Vasantham. It aired in Singapore and Malaysia on Mediacorp Vasantham, Its full length episodes and released its episodes on their app Toggle, a live TV feature was introduced on Toggle with English and Tamil Subtitle.

References

External links 
 Vasantham Official Website Toggle
 Vasantham Facebook Facebook
 Udayam Serial Episodes Toggle

Vasantham TV original programming
Tamil-language television shows in Singapore
2017 Tamil-language television series debuts
2017 Tamil-language television series endings
Singaporean reality television series
Tamil-language reality television series